The Greater Antillean elaenia (Elaenia fallax) is a species of bird in the family Tyrannidae. It is found on Hispaniola (Dominican Republic and Haiti) and Jamaica.

Its natural habitats are subtropical or tropical moist lowland forests and subtropical or tropical moist montane forests.

Subspecies
Two subspecies are currently recognized. As they have deep genetic divergence and differing vocalizations, they may be candidates for future species splits:
 Elaenia fallax fallax – Sclater, 1861: found in Jamaica 
 Elaenia fallax cherriei – Cory, 1895: found in Hispaniola (Dominican Republic and Haiti)

References

 Raffaele, Herbert; James Wiley, Orlando Garrido, Allan Keith & Janis Raffaele (2003) Birds of the West Indies, Christopher Helm, London.

greater Antillean elaenia
Birds of the Greater Antilles
Birds of Jamaica
Birds of the Dominican Republic
Birds of Haiti
Birds of Hispaniola
Endemic birds of the Caribbean
greater Antillean elaenia
greater Antillean elaenia
Taxonomy articles created by Polbot